Cheshmeh-ye Abek (also Romanized as Cheshmeh-ye Ābek; also known as Cheshm Ābek) is a village in Taftan-e Jonubi Rural District, Nukabad District, Khash County, Sistan and Baluchestan Province, Iran. At the 2006 census, its population was 22, in 7 families.

References 

Populated places in Khash County